Jack Winston Darcus (born February 22, 1941 in Vancouver, British Columbia) is a Canadian film director, screenwriter, and painter. Since graduating from the University of British Columbia with a Bachelor of Arts Degree in 1963, Jack Darcus has divided his artistic career between painting and filmmaking. In 1969, already an established painter, he directed his first feature film - a documentary entitled Great Coups of History. Though consistently well received by critics, his films have never reached a large audience beyond film scholars and fanatics. In 1982 he wrote and directed Deserters, his most acclaimed film which concerns two American Vietnam War deserters in Canada. The film earned Darcus three Genie Award nominations for his direction, screenplay and editing. Darcus had also directed for the CBC and Atlantis Films. Darcus has not directed a film since 1997 but still remains a devoted painter whose paintings have been exhibited nationally and internationally, and he has also written three novels.

Selected filmography
Great Coups of History (1969) (Documentary)
Proxyhawks (1971)
The Wolfpen Principle (1974)
Deserters (1983)
Overnight (1985)
Kingsgate (1989)
The Portrait (1992)
Silence (1997)

References

External links

Jack Darcus Official Website

1941 births
Living people
20th-century Canadian painters
Canadian male painters
21st-century Canadian painters
Artists from Vancouver
Film producers from British Columbia
Film directors from Vancouver
Writers from Vancouver
20th-century Canadian screenwriters
Canadian male screenwriters
20th-century Canadian male artists
21st-century Canadian male artists